Lowmac is a United Kingdom railway term for a design of low-floored ('well') wagon. A Lowmac's purpose is for carrying vehicles or equipment that would normally be over the recommended height of a normal flatbed wagon, and hence exceed the loading gauge.

History 
'Lowmac' is the telegraphic term within the Great Western Railway's coding of railway wagons for a well wagon with a recessed floor. In full the code is 'Low Machinery'; meaning a wagon with a low floor used for carrying machinery. The term was also employed by British Railways but as an actual wagon name. 

Lowmac style wagons were widely used throughout the 1890s till the 1950s when road transport was able to take their loads of machinery and vehicles. All were removed from service and, except those on preserved railways, scrapped by British Railways because they were replaced by more modern bogie wagons such as warwell wagons.

See also 
 Class U special wagon
 Well car
 Well wagon

External links 
 Model Railway Site featuring some detail on Lowmacs

British railway wagons